Wilfried Stephane Singo (born 25 December 2000) is an Ivorian professional footballer who plays as a defender for Torino and the Ivory Coast national team.

Club career

Early career
A youth product of Denguélé, Singo joined Torino in the summer of 2019 where he was assigned to the under-19 squad coached by Federico Coppitelli. Initially deployed as a centre back, he was progressively shifted to the right full-back position over the course of the season.

Torino
On 1 August of the same year, Singo made his senior debut with Torino under Walter Mazzarri in a 4–1 UEFA Europa League win over Debreceni. He made his Serie A debut with the club on 27 June 2020 in a 4–2 away loss against Cagliari. In his first game played as a starting player, he scored his first senior goal in the penultimate round of the season at home against Roma.

International career
Singo represented the Ivory Coast U20s for 2019 Africa U-20 Cup of Nations qualification matches in 2018. He debuted for the senior Ivory Coast national football team in a friendly 2–1 win over Burkina Faso on 5 June 2021.

Style of play
Singo primarily plays as a right wing-back or right full-back, but he previously played as a central defender. He possesses notable pace and strength as well as good individual technique.

Career statistics

Club

International

References

External links
 

2000 births
Living people
Ivorian footballers
Ivory Coast international footballers
Ivory Coast under-20 international footballers
Association football defenders
Torino F.C. players
Serie A players
Ivorian expatriate footballers
Ivorian expatriate sportspeople in Italy
Expatriate footballers in Italy
Footballers at the 2020 Summer Olympics
Olympic footballers of Ivory Coast